La Fiesta de todos (The party of Everyone) is a 1979 Argentinian film produced by the Ente Autárquico Mundial 1978 (EAM´78), organization in charge of the organization of the 1978 FIFA World Cup  where with a cast of Argentinian actors like Luis Sandrini and other shows the feeling of the Argentinian people towards the event.

Plot

The film is a largely documentary reconstruction of Argentina's victory in the 1978 FIFA World Cup, interspersed with different fictional episodes that occur during the same period.

Cast

Juan Carlos Calabró

Ricardo Espalter
Luis Landriscina
Julio de Grazia
Nélida Lobato
Félix Luna
Marta Lynch
Roberto Maidana
César Luis Menotti
José María Muñoz
Luis Sandrini
Malvina Pastorino
Gogó Andreu
Aldo Barbero
Elsa Berenguer
Amalia Bernabé
Rudy Chernicoff
Alfonso De Grazia
Graciela Dufau
Ulises Dumont
Alberto Irízar
Susú Pecoraro
Elena Sedova
Silvina Rada
Néstor Ibarra
Enrique Macaya Márquez
Ricardo Darín
Roberto Ayala
Héctor Drazer
Diego Bonadeo
Gustavo Carfagna
Miguel Jordán
Jorge de la Riestra
Margarita Luro
Jesús Pamplonas
Atilio Regaló
Tacholas
Tempo
Jorge Villalba
Memé Vigo
Marcos Woinski

External links
 

1979 films
Argentine documentary films
1970s Spanish-language films
1978 FIFA World Cup
1970s Argentine films